Michal Tučný (11 January 1947 – 10 March 1995) was a Czech singer and songwriter. He is considered one of the most popular Czech country singers and he is regarded as a legend of the Czech country music (he was often referred to as the king of the genre).

Biography 
Michal Tučný was born in Prague, Czechoslovakia, in 1947. He played piano as a child. In 1965, he passed the matura exam at a business school. By profession, he was a qualified shopkeeper (which he mentions in several of his songs). His whole life he was a devote fan of SK Slavia Prague. He began his musical career at the age of 14 in Dixieland. In 1967, he participated in the first festival of the Czech Country Music. He played with many different bands, including "Rangers". In 1969, he became a soloist of the group "Greenhorns". In 1974, he joined the group "Fešáci", and in 1980, he created his own band "Tučňáci" (meaning "Penguins", but relating to his surname).

The cause of his death was liver cancer. He is buried in Hoštice in the South Bohemian Region; the town square there bears his name. His grave is marked by a stone in the shape of a cowboy hat.

Notable songs

 Všichni jsou už v Mexiku (original song: They All Went to Mexico)
 Blízko Little Big Hornu (with Greenhorns, original song: Jim Bridger)
 Báječná ženská (original song: Good Hearted Woman)
 Pověste ho vejš (covered by Rattlesnake Annie as Hang her higher)
 Prodavač (with Fešáci, adaptation of The Auctioneer)

His other songs include:
 Blues Folsomské věznice (with Greenhorns) (original song: Folsom Prison Blues)
 Tam u nebeských bran 
 Poslední kovboj
 Koukám, jak celá země vstává
 Snídaně v trávě (original song: Sea of Heartbreak)
 Ještě dlouhou cestu mám
 Nádraží (with band Fešáci)
 Boty z kůže toulavejch psů
 Jak chcete žít bez koní
 El paso (with Greenhorns, original song: El Paso)
 Feleena z El pasa (with Greenhorns, original song: Feleena (From El Paso))
 Chtěl bych být medvídkem (+ Zdeněk Rytíř, original song: The Teddy Bear Song)
 Cesty toulavý (original song: On the Road Again)
 Vlak v 0,5 (with Greenhorns)
 Hromskej den (+ Tomáš Linka with Greenhorns) 
 Já tajně cvičím (with band Fešáci)
 Šlapej dál (with Greenhorns)

Discography
Michal Tučný's discography consists of more than 30 albums and compilations.

Filmography

External links

Michal Tučný at the Czech and Slovak Film Database 

1947 births
1995 deaths
Czechoslovak male singers
Czech country musicians
Musicians from Prague
Deaths from liver cancer